Dhanauli Rampur is a village located in Ghosi tehsil of Mau district, Uttar Pradesh. It has total 530 families residing. Dhanauli Rampur has population of 3,452 as per government records.

Administration
Dhanauli Rampur village is administrated by Gram Pradhan through its Gram Panchayat, who is elected representative of village as per constitution of India and Panchyati Raj Act. Dhanauli comes under Ghosi block

Nearby places
 Ghosi
 Dohrighat
 Mau
 Barhalganj
 Azamgarh                  
 Gorakhpur

References

External links
Villages in Mau Uttar Pradesh

Villages in Mau district